Frondibacter aureus is a Gram-negative, facultatively anaerobic, rod-shaped and non-motile bacterium from the genus of Frondibacter which has been isolated from leaf litter from the Nakama River.

References 

Flavobacteria
Bacteria described in 2015